Harry Newton Redman (December 26, 1869 - December 26, 1958) was an American composer, writer, and artist, born in Illinois.  He wrote mainly chamber music, including two string quartets, and composed some songs.  He was also active as a painter, and wrote a musical dictionary.

Textbooks 
 A Pronouncing Dictionary of Musical Terms, Boston, Knight & Millet (1901)
 Redman's Musical Dictionary and Pronouncing Guide, Theodore Presser Company (1910)

References
General references
 
 The New Grove Dictionary of American Music, four volumes, edited by Hugh Wiley Hitchcock (1923–2007) and Stanley Sadie (1930–2005), Macmillan Press, London (1986)
 Baker's Biographical Dictionary of Musicians, Eighth edition, revised by Nicolas Slonimsky (1894–1995), Macmillan Publishing Co., New York (1992)
 Baker's Biographical Dictionary of Twentieth-Century Classical Musicians, by Nicolas Slonimsky (1894–1995), Schirmer Books, New York (1997)

1869 births
1958 deaths
American male composers
American composers
19th-century American painters
American male painters
20th-century American painters
20th-century American male artists
New England Conservatory faculty
Musicians from Illinois
Painters from Illinois
19th-century American male artists